Red Lion (Pennsylvania Dutch: Rot Leeb) is a borough in York County, Pennsylvania, settled in 1852 and incorporated on January 16, 1880. The population was 6,506 at the 2020 census.

History

Red Lion, settled in 1852, was named after one of the first pubs in town, the Red Lion Tavern.

The town was a main stop along the old Maryland and Pennsylvania Railroad, known locally as the "Ma & Pa" Railroad. That railroad ran from York County to Baltimore, Maryland.

Red Lion was once famous for the many brands of cigars made there. The town produced millions of cigars per month, about 10% of the cigars made in the United States. The town raises a cigar every New Year's Eve. It was also known nationwide for its furniture industry, with several large factories producing ornate, hand crafted furniture for over 100 years. The furniture industry has mostly shifted to kitchen cabinet production and retail store fixtures over the last 40 years.

The Consumers Cigar Box Company and Red Lion Borough Historic District are listed on the National Register of Historic Places.

Geography
Red Lion is located about 35 miles (56.3 mi) southeast of Harrisburg. According to the U.S. Census Bureau, the borough has a total area of 1.3 square miles (3.3 km2), all of it land.

Demographics

As of the census of 2000, there were 6,149 people, 2,575 households, and 1,645 families residing in the borough. The population density was 4,789.9 people per square mile (1,854.8/km2). There were 2,729 housing units at an average density of 2,125.8 per square mile (823.2/km2). The racial makeup of the borough was 97.12% White, 0.60% African American, 0.24% Native American, 0.41% Asian, 0.05% Pacific Islander, 0.33% from other races, and 1.25% from two or more races. Hispanic or Latino of any race were 0.91% of the population.

There were 2,575 households, out of which 31.6% had children under the age of 18 living with them, 46.8% were married couples living together, 12.1% had a female householder with no husband present, and 36.1% were non-families. 29.6% of all households were made up of individuals, and 11.0% had someone living alone who was 65 years of age or older. The average household size was 2.37 and the average family size was 2.92.

In the borough the population was spread out, with 25.1% under the age of 18, 9.3% from 18 to 24, 32.2% from 25 to 44, 19.9% from 45 to 64, and 13.5% who were 65 years of age or older. The median age was 34 years. For every 100 females, there were 92.9 males. For every 100 females age 18 and over, there were 86.8 males.

The median income for a household in the borough was $35,828, and the median income for a family was $41,850. Males had a median income of $31,595 versus $21,934 for females. The per capita income for the borough was $17,723. About 6.1% of families and 10.4% of the population were below the poverty line, including 17.4% of those under age 18 and 11.1% of those age 65 or over.

Schools 
Red Lion Area Senior High School
 Red Lion Area Junior High School
Locust Grove Elementary School
Windsor Manor Elementary School(Now a Kindergarten school)
Larry J. Macaluso Elementary School
Mazie Gable Elementary School
Pleasant View Elementary School
Clearview Elementary School
North Hopewell-Winterstown Elementary School
 River Rock Academy - Red Lion Campus
On March 19, 2009, the Red Lion Area School Board voted 8–0 to close 2 elementary schools in the district. Chanceford and Edgar Moore elementary schools closed at the end of the 2009 school year. The students from the schools were placed in other schools throughout the district including a brand new elementary school. The new school, Larry J. Macaluso Elementary School, was completed in 2009 and is named after the Red Lion Area School District superintendent, who retired the same year..

School shooting 

On April 24, 2003, at the Red Lion Junior High School in Red Lion, James Sheets killed the principal of the school, Eugene Segro, before killing himself.

Local Venues 

Red Lion, Pennsylvania has a rich musical heritage. It is the home of the Red Lion Felton band which was first started in 1932 as the Red Lion Concert Band and then later joined with the Felton Band in 1972. The band is composed of local musicians of all ages and performs at many community events. The Red Lion Area School District has also been awarded the NAMM Foundation's “Best Community for Music Education” from 2012 to 2018 which considers the quality of programs and availability of music education within the schools and community.

Red Lion is also home to an extensive array of local underground bands and independent local artists, perhaps the most popular being Halestorm, who reached the top ten on the US Mainstream Rock charts and receives extensive local radio play.

Red Lion also had a fully functional opera house and a downtown movie theater until the mid-1960s. The opera house has since been converted to housing, and the movie theater was demolished and is now a parking lot.

Red Lion has many talented veteran and up and coming artists and musical talents of all genres (including funk, blues, jazz, bluegrass and country). The Guitar Spot USA and Tom's Music Trade are part of what's now known as a "Musician's Row" of sorts to local musicians and artists.

Notable people
Lzzy Hale and her brother Arejay Hale, members of the rock band Halestorm
Germar Rudolf, convicted Holocaust denier
Butch Wynegar, former professional baseball player

References

External links
Red Lion Official Website

Populated places established in 1852
Boroughs in York County, Pennsylvania
1880 establishments in Pennsylvania
Populated places on the Underground Railroad